The main national championships for the 2019–20 season of outdoor track and field in Australia were not held due to impacts of the COVID-19 pandemic, but eight events were completed prior to the cancellation. The 10,000 metres took place at the Zatopek 10K on 14 December 2019 at Lakeside Stadium in Melbourne, the mile run took place at the Albie Thomas meet at the Crest Athletic Centre in Bankstown on 21 December 2019, and the 5000 metres took place at the Melbourne Track Classic on 6 February 2020. The decathlon and heptathlon championships were held in Brisbane on 15 and 16 February 2020.

Medal summary

Men

Women

References

External links 
 Athletics Australia website

2020
Australian Athletics Championships
Australian Championships
Athletics Championships